The Tom is a river in Russia, a right tributary of the Ob in Central Siberia. Its watershed lies within the Republic of Khakassia, Kemerovo Oblast, and Tomsk Oblast.

The Tom flows from the Abakan Range (a northern continuation of the Altai Mountains) northward through the Kuznetsk Basin.

Cities on the Tom River include Mezhdurechensk, Novokuznetsk, Kemerovo, Yurga, Tomsk, and Seversk.

The Aba people live near the Tom River.

Main tributaries
The largest tributaries of the Tom are, from source to mouth:

 Belsu (right)
 Usa (right)
 Mrassu (left)
 Kondoma (left)
 Aba (left)
 Verchnaya Ters (right)
 Srednaya Ters (right)
 Nizhnaya Ters (right)
 Chernovoy Naryk (left)
 Taydon (right)
 Unga (left)
 Basandayka (right)
 Iskitim (left)
 Ushayka (right)

Gallery

References

Rivers of Khakassia
Rivers of Kemerovo Oblast
Rivers of Tomsk Oblast